Kadana Dam is an earthen and masonry on the Mahi River in Mahisagar district of Gujarat, India. The dam was constructed between 1979 and 1990. The dams a pumped-storage hydroelectric power-station. The first two generators were commissioned in 1990, the second two in 1998. The first two generators commissioned, Stage I, are reversible kaplan turbines that allow the power station to generate during peak hours then pump  back into the reservoir during low hours such as night.

Power Plant
The dam has an installed capacity of 240 MW.

Kadana Eddy Marking Sedimentary Structures
Kadana Eddy Marking Sedimentary Structures nearby has been declared the National Geological Monuments of India by the Geological Survey of India (GSI), for their protection, maintenance, promotion and enhancement of geotourism.

See also

Mahi Bajaj Sagar Dam – located upstream

References

Dams completed in 1989
Energy infrastructure completed in 1990
Energy infrastructure completed in 1998
Dams in Gujarat
Hydroelectric power stations in Gujarat
Pumped-storage hydroelectric power stations in India
Masonry dams
1989 establishments in Gujarat
Mahisagar district
20th-century architecture in India